Exodus: Tales from the Enchanted Kingdom is a 2005 Filipino fantasy film directed by Erik Matti and produced by Imus Productions and Reality Entertainment in cooperation with Ignite Media Inc. and Enchanted Kingdom Inc., as the title alludes to the popular Filipino theme park of the same name. It was released on December 25, 2005, and was an official entry to the 2005 Metro Manila Film Festival.

Plot
The film opens in the Enchanted Kingdom, where the story is narrated by a wizard in purple (the Enchanted Kingdom theme park's mascot).

Ordinary humans led by King Bantayan, a comatosed man, living only through a life support device and with dwarves maintaining it, are being annihilated by the all-powerful evil king Bagulbol and his creatures of the dark, created from human hatred and human experiments. To end their tribulation, mankind’s leaders paid a mercenary with exceptional fighting skills to defend them. That mercenary is Exodus, the drifter.

Nearing their extinction, King Bantayan and the leaders of men dispatched Exodus on a quest to capture five elementals to aid them in the final battle against King Bagulbol. Exodus was able to convince the last Earth (Tikbalang), Wind (Aswang), Fire (Santelmo), and Water (Water Nymph) elementals and they became allies in ridding the land of evil. Later it was revealed that Exodus is also last of the remaining Baylan (priestly race), exterminated many years ago by King Bagulbol. His minions are created by the human captives that was experimented and allowed hatred to consume them.

Exodus and his enchanted friends fought several enemies, including a whip wielding General, an Executioner, an Archer and a Harpy like creature and were victorious. Exodus faced both Bagulbol and his card reader sidekick and beat them, while the remaining human defenders are holding their ground, suffering severe casualties and destruction of their last hideout due to evil minion attacks. They conquered humankind's greatest enemy and peace was again established. And the Elementals return to their places. He then recreated his father's kingdom with the remaining humans.

Cast
 Ramon 'Bong' Revilla Jr. as Exodus, a Baylan and the main protagonist, drifter, mercenary and a paid soldier, revealed as the last equalizer and hope for freedom.
 Ramboy Revilla as a young Exodus
 Jolo Revilla as teenage Exodus
 Iya Villania as Lin-Ay, the Water Elemental, a Water Nymph chained and sealed due to her curse (her excessive beauty).
 Benjie Paras as Tayho, the Earth Elemental, a wild and active Tikbalang
 BJ Forbes as Silab, the Fire Elemental, a Santelmo that can divide into three (2 Spear-holding clones and the real body).
 Aubrey Miles as Bangkila, the Air Elemental, an Aswang that is disguised as a scarecrow, with sharp claws, reminiscent of the creature from Jeepers Creepers.
 Paolo Bediones as Maestro Eliseo, the comatosed leader of the Bantayan.
 Jay-R as King Bagulbol, a corrupted dark priest and the primary antagonist that killed Exodus' father.
 Long Mejia as Alas, King Bagulbol's messenger, soothsayer and card wielding sidekick.
 Bobbie Zialcita / Joonee Gamboa (voice) as Eldar, the wizard of the Enchanted Kingdom and the narrator

Awards

References

External links

 Filmfest contender

2005 films
Philippine fantasy films
2000s Tagalog-language films
2000s English-language films
Films directed by Erik Matti